Ruy López  may refer to:

 Ruy López de Segura, 16th-century Spanish priest and early chess master
 Ruy López de Villalobos, 16th-century Spanish navigator
 Ruy Lopez, one of the oldest and most popular chess openings, also known as the "Spanish Opening"

See also
 Roy Lopez (disambiguation), people with a similar name

Lopez, Ruy